The giant pangolin (Smutsia gigantea) is the largest species in the family of pangolins.  Members of the species inhabit Africa with a range stretching along the equator from West Africa to Uganda. It subsists almost entirely on ants and termites. The species was first described by Johann Karl Wilhelm Illiger in 1815.

Description
The giant pangolin is the largest of all pangolin species. While its average mass has not been measured, one specimen was found to weigh 33 kg (72.6 lb). Males are larger than females, with male body lengths about 140 cm (4.6 ft) and females about 125 cm (4.1 ft).  Like all pangolins, the species is armored with large, brown to reddish-brown scales formed from keratin. Curiously, it also has eyelashes. The giant pangolin has a long snout, a long, thick tail, and large front claws.

The animal has a strong sense of smell and large anal glands. Its secretions may be significant to animal communication. The species walks with most of its weight on its columnar rear legs, and curls its front paws, walking on the outside of the wrists rather than the palms to protect the claws. By using its tail for balance, it often walks upright as a biped.

Distribution and habitat

The giant pangolin inhabits many countries, with the largest concentration in Uganda, Tanzania, and western Kenya. It is found mainly in the savanna, rainforest, and forest, inhabiting areas with large termite populations and available water. It does not inhabit high-altitude areas.

Behavior and ecology
 
The giant pangolin, like other pangolins, is nocturnal, which makes observation difficult. It is also usually solitary, although in one case an adult was seen in a burrow with a juvenile. The species is capable of climbing trees and other objects.

Diet
Like all pangolins, the giant pangolin is a specialized insectivore that lacks teeth and the ability to chew. Its diet mainly consists of ants and termites, which it finds by tearing open anthills and termite nests, both subterranean and mound-type.

Because of its relatively large size, the giant pangolin is particularly well-suited to breaking open termite mounds by leaning on the mound and resting its weight on its tail, and then ripping into the mound with its front claws. The combination of weight and physical damage quickly leads to a partial collapse of the mound, exposing the termites. Only the adults are strong enough to do this; their young must follow behind their mothers until they grow large enough to do it for themselves.

Reproduction
Very little information about the reproduction of the giant pangolin is known. As in all pangolins, infants have soft scales that eventually harden, and are born with open eyes. They cannot walk on their legs, but can move on their bellies. During age 6–8 weeks, the young often spew a yellow secretion from their anal glands (that is often said to smell of decay and cabbage) to keep predators and other animals from taking advantage of their mothers.

Threats 
The giant pangolin is threatened by habitat destruction and deforestation, and hunting for the bushmeat trade. Between 2011 and 2015, nine shipments with pangolin body parts were seized in Asia that originated in Nigeria. They contained  pangolin meat and close to  pangolin scales that were destined to China and Laos.

Conservation
The giant pangolin has been listed on CITES Appendix I since January 2017.

References

External links

giant pangolin
Fauna of Central Africa
Pangolin, Giant)
Mammals of West Africa
giant pangolin
Species endangered by habitat loss
Species endangered by deforestation
Species endangered by human consumption
Species endangered by human consumption for medicinal or magical purposes